Inquisitor elkeae is a species of sea snail, a marine gastropod mollusk in the family Pseudomelatomidae, the turrids and allies.

Description
The length of the shell varies between 13 mm and 26 mm.

Distribution
This marine species occurs off the Philippines

References

 Stahlschmidt, P. (2013). Two new Inquisitor species (Gastropoda: Pseudomelatomidae) from the Philippines. Miscellanea Malacologica. 6(3): 47-50

External links
 Gastropods.com: Inquisitor elkeae

elkeae
Gastropods described in 2013